Jakub Tomeček (born 23 May 1991) is a Czech sport shooter. At the 2012 Summer Olympics he competed in the Men's skeet, finishing in 19th place.

References

External links

1991 births
Living people
Skeet shooters
Czech male sport shooters
Olympic shooters of the Czech Republic
Shooters at the 2012 Summer Olympics
Shooters at the 2015 European Games
Universiade medalists in shooting
People from Kyjov
Universiade bronze medalists for the Czech Republic
Shooters at the 2019 European Games
European Games medalists in shooting
European Games bronze medalists for the Czech Republic
Medalists at the 2013 Summer Universiade
Shooters at the 2020 Summer Olympics
Sportspeople from the South Moravian Region